Hayden Glacier is located in the US state of Oregon. It is to the northeast of Middle Sister and south of North Sister, both of which are extinct volcanoes.

See also
 List of glaciers in the United States

References

Glaciers of Oregon
Glaciers of Deschutes County, Oregon